In Hawaiian legends, Alo is a name of a High Chief that ruled as the Moʻi of Maui. He was the sovereign king or chief of the island of Maui. Sometimes he was called Alau.

There is no any archaeological evidence for him. He was born ca. 1186.

He is mentioned by Abraham Fornander, who was both ethnologist and judge.

Family 
Alo was a son and successor of King Mauiloa, who ruled over Western Maui. His mother was named Kauhua, but her parents are not known to us.

He was thus a grandson of noted Chief Hanalaa, great-grandson of Palena, great-great grandson of mythical King Haho and great-great-great grandson of Paumakua of Maui, who was the mythical ancestor of chiefs of Maui. He followed his father as sovereign of Maui. 

No famous legends remember Alo or his wife, who was likely very noble. In one chant, his wife is named Moeiekana (or Moekeaea). He fathered Prince Kuhimana and daughter Kaumana I, and they two were married. They were twins and their union was sacred.

His son Kuhimana would succeed him as King of Maui, and grandson of Alo was famous High Chief Kamaloohua.

Family tree

References
 Abraham Fornander, An Account of the Polynesian Race: Its Origin and Migrations, Rutland, VT: Charles E. Tuttle Company, 1969.

Notes 

Royalty of Maui
Hawaiian legends
1180s births
13th-century deaths